Thomas Caldecott may refer to:

 Thomas E. Caldecott (1878–1951), pharmacist and politician in California
 Thomas W. Caldecott (1914–1994), American judge and politician in California